Marko Marinković (born 6 January 1994) is a Serbian professional footballer who plays as a centre-back for Budućnost Dobanovci.

Club career

Red Star Belgrade
Born in Užice, Marinković passed the Red Star Belgrade youth school. During the time he spent under contract with the team, Marinković did not make an official debut for Red Star Belgrade. He terminated the deal in summer 2016.

After he spenth his youth categories, Marinković was loaned to club from Sopot for the 2012–13 season, together with Darko Lazić and some other players from youth team of Red Star Belgrade. He played 15 matches and scored 2 goals until the end of season.

In summer 2013, he returned from loan he spent in Sopot, and was with first team on the beginning of 2013–14 season. After 2 matches in qualifications for the 2013–14 UEFA Europa League against ÍBV, he spent sitting on the bench, Marinković was sent to Smederevo on loan. He made 17 First League appearances, and also played 1 cup match against Čukarički.

For 2014–15, Marinković was loaned to Sinđelić Beograd. He made 28 First League appearances with 27 starts, and was substituted in for one time, and played one cup match against Sloboda Užice. He also scored two goals, against Bežanija in the 1st, and Sloga Kraljevo in 14th fixture of the Serbian First League. After Uroš Mirković moved to Donji Srem in winter break off-season, Marinković became the captain for the 2nd half of season.

Marinković was loaned to Spartak Subotica at the beginning of season 2015–16. He made his official debut for Spartak Subotica in the 3rd fixture of Serbian SuperLiga, against Mladost Lučani, played on 1 August 2015. After only 5 matches for Spartak, he returnted to Belgrade.

BSK Borča
At the beginning of 2016, Marinković moved to BSK Borča, on loan. He started match against Loznica in tandem with Aleksandar Cvetković, but he got the red card in 61 minute of match. Previously, he scored a goal beginning of second half. After missed several matches later, he returned in squad. He also scored goals for wins against ČSK Čelarevo in 25, and Napredak Kruševac in 29 fixture of the Serbian First League. During the spring half of 2015–16 season, Marinković made 11 league matches for BSK Borča at total.

Marinković also stayed with BSK Borča for the 2016–17 Serbian First League, but after he broke the contract with Red Star Belgrade, Marinković joined the club as a single player. Later, during the first half of the same season, he appeared in a cup match against his former club.

Borac Čačak
On 23 January 2017, Marinković signed two-and-a-half year deal with Borac Čačak.

Career statistics

References

External links
 Marko Marinković stats at utakmica.rs 
 
 
 
 

1994 births
Living people
Sportspeople from Užice
Association football defenders
Serbian footballers
Serbia youth international footballers
FK Napredak Kruševac players
FK Sopot players
FK Smederevo players
FK Sinđelić Beograd players
FK Spartak Subotica players
FK BSK Borča players
FK Borac Čačak players
FC Spartak Trnava players
FK Sloboda Tuzla players
FK Novi Pazar players
FK Budućnost Dobanovci players
Serbian First League players
Serbian SuperLiga players
Premier League of Bosnia and Herzegovina players
Expatriate footballers in Slovakia
Expatriate footballers in Bosnia and Herzegovina
Serbian expatriate sportspeople in Slovakia
Serbian expatriate sportspeople in Bosnia and Herzegovina